The Whyalla Football League Inc. is an Australian rules football competition based in the town of Whyalla on the east coast of the Eyre Peninsula region of South Australia. It is an affiliated member of the South Australian National Football League (SANFL).

Current clubs

Brief history
The Whyalla Football Association was formed in 1920 with founding clubs Central Whyalla, North Whyalla and South Whyalla, although competition has been noted to have occurred prior to this. West Whyalla was formed in 1946 and the competition now had four teams.

In 1961 the Whyalla Football League (together with the Great Northern Football Association and the Port Pirie Football Association) formed the Spencer Gulf Football League.  

In 1967 the Whyalla-based clubs left the Spencer Gulf Football League and reformed the Whyalla Football League.

Champion past SANFL players from Whyalla include triple Magarey Medallist Barrie Robran and inaugural Adelaide Crows coach Graham Cornes while 4 time SANFL Premiership coach Neil Kerley spent two seasons as Captain-Coach of the North Whyalla Magpies, leading them to the premiership in both seasons (1954 and 1955).

Former Whyalla footballers who have reached the AFL include Robert Shirley, Brett Burton Isaac Weetra and Levi Greenwood.

Premierships

Whyalla Football League

 1939 North Whyalla 
 1940 Central Whyalla 
 1941 North Whyalla 
 1942 North Whyalla 
 1943 North Whyalla 
 1944 South Whyalla 
 1945 Central Whyalla 
 1946 South Whyalla 
 1947 Central Whyalla 
 1948 North Whyalla 
 1949 South Whyalla 
 1950 North Whyalla 
 1951 North Whyalla 
 1952 South Whyalla 
 1953 Central Whyalla 
 1954 North Whyalla 
 1955 North Whyalla 
 1956 Central Whyalla 
 1957 West Whyalla 
 1958 West Whyalla 
 1959 West Whyalla 
 1960 West Whyalla 
 1967 West Whyalla 
 1968 South Whyalla 
 1969 West Whyalla 
 1970 West Whyalla 
 1971 West Whyalla 
 1972 West Whyalla 
 1973 West Whyalla 
 1974 Central Whyalla 
 1975 Central Whyalla 
 1976 West Whyalla 
 1977 North Whyalla 
 1978 North Whyalla 
 1979 North Whyalla 
 1980 Central Whyalla 
 1981 South Whyalla 
 1982 Central Whyalla 
 1983 West Whyalla 
 1984 South Whyalla 
 1985 Weeroona Bay 
 1986 Roopena 
 1987 Weeroona Bay 
 1988 Roopena 
 1989 Central Whyalla 
 1990 Roopena 
 1991 Roopena 
 1992 Roopena 
 1993 South Whyalla 
 1994 South Whyalla 
 1995 Weeroona Bay 
 1996 Weeroona Bay 
 1997 Roopena 
 1998 West Whyalla 
 1999 Central Whyalla 
 2000 Central Whyalla 
 2001 Central Whyalla 
 2002 Central Whyalla 
 2003 Central Whyalla 
 2004 Central Whyalla 
 2005 West Whyalla 
 2006 Central Whyalla 
 2007 Central Whyalla 
 2008 North Whyalla 
 2009 Roopena 
 2010 Roopena 
 2011 North Whyalla 
 2012 West Whyalla 
 2013 West Whyalla 
 2014 North Whyalla 
 2015 North Whyalla 
 2016 West Whyalla 
 2017 West Whyalla 
 2018 West Whyalla 
 2019 West Whyalla 
 2020 Central Whyalla
 2021 Central Whyalla
 2022 Central Whyalla

Team of the Century
In 2001 the Whyalla Football League selected its Team of the Century.

2012 Ladder

2013 Ladder

2014 Ladder

See also
 Alan Didak
 Levi Greenwood

Books
 Encyclopedia of South Australian country football clubs, compiled by Peter Lines. 
 South Australian country football digest by Peter Lines

References

External links 
 
 Footypedia - WFL
 country footy
 WFL Profile on Full Points Footy

Australian rules football competitions in South Australia
Whyalla